Sideroxylon cubense is a species of plant in the family Sapotaceae. It is native to Cuba, the Dominican Republic, Haiti, the Leeward Islands, and Puerto Rico.

Sideroxylon confertum was assessed as "vulnerable" in the 1998 IUCN Red List, where it was considered endemic to Cuba, but  was treated as included within the more widely distributed S. cubense.

References

cubense
Flora of Cuba
Flora of the Dominican Republic
Flora of Haiti
Flora of the Leeward Islands
Flora of Puerto Rico
Taxonomy articles created by Polbot